Twilight (France: Félicie Nanteuil) is a 1944 French drama film directed by Marc Allégret and starring Claude Dauphin, Micheline Presle and Louis Jourdan.

Plot
Two men are in love with the same woman.

Production
The film was shot at the Victorine Studios in Nice during 1942.

Reception
The movie was popular at the French box office.

Cast
 Claude Dauphin as Aimé Cavalier 
 Micheline Presle as Félicie Nanteuil 
 Louis Jourdan as Robert de Ligny 
 Jacques Louvigny as Pradel 
 Marcelle Praince as Mme Nanteuil 
 Marion Malville as Fagette 
 Charlotte Clasis as Mme Pierson 
 Mady Berry as Mme Michon 
 Charles Lavialle as Durville 
 Max Révol 
 Henry Lefevre
 Jean d'Yd as Le docteur Socrate 
 Gaston Orbal as Constantin
 Edmond Beauchamp as Le jeune premier 
 Danièle Delorme as La camarade de Félicie 
 Roger Pigaut as Petit rôle 
 Pierre Prévert as L'appariteur 
 Simone Sylvestre as Mme de Ligny

References

External links

Felicie Nanteuil at Monsieur.louisjourdan.net (in French)
Felicie Nanteuil at My French Film Festival
Review of film at French Film Site

1944 films
Films directed by Marc Allégret
French black-and-white films
1940s French-language films
1944 drama films
French drama films
1940s French films